The 1998 Arizona State Sun Devils baseball team represented Arizona State University in the 1998 NCAA Division I baseball season. The Sun Devils played their home games at Packard Stadium. The team was coached by Pat Murphy in his fourth season at Arizona State.

The Sun Devils reached the College World Series, finishing as the runner up to Southern California.

Personnel

Roster

Coaches

Schedule

Ranking movements

References

Arizona State
Arizona State Sun Devils baseball seasons
College World Series seasons
Arizonia
Arizona State